"Ciao Adios" is a song by English singer Anne-Marie. After performing it live in preview at KOKO, on 28 November 2016, it was released as the second single from her debut studio album, Speak Your Mind (2018) on 10 February 2017. Primarily a pop song with dancehall elements, "Ciao Adios" was written by Anne-Marie alongside Jenn Decilveo, Mason Levy, and Tom Meredith, with Meredith and Levy (MdL) handling production.

Composition
"Ciao Adios" is a dancehall-inflected pop song. The song's lyrics refer to a girl that finds out that the guy she is dating is cheating on her, and thus she decides not to waste further time by leaving him: "Ciao, Adios, I'm done" (ciao and adiós are respectively the Italian and Spanish words for "goodbye").

Live performances
Anne-Marie performed "Ciao Adios" live in preview at KOKO, on 28 November 2016. She also performed the song on her 2016 tour.

Music video
The "Ciao Adios" music video was released on 9 March 2017 on YouTube and features Anne-Marie with her girl gang dancing in Marrakech (Morocco) with plenty of colors.

Chart performance
In the UK and Ireland "Ciao Adios" reached numbers 9 and 13, respectively. The song gave Anne-Marie her first solo top 10 single in the UK and spent a total of 23 weeks on the chart.

Track listing
Digital download
"Ciao Adios" – 3:20
"Ciao Adios" (Extended Mix) - 7:56
"Ciao Adios" (Acoustic) - 4:44

Digital download
"Ciao Adios" (Acoustic) – 4:44
"Ciao Adios" - 3:20
"Ciao Adios" (Extended Mix) - 7:56

Charts

Weekly charts

Year-end charts

Certifications

Release history

References

2017 singles
2017 songs
Anne-Marie (singer) songs
Songs written by Jennifer Decilveo
Songs written by Anne-Marie (singer)